Novo Holdings A/S (formerly Novo A/S) is the Novo Nordisk Foundation's wholly owned holding company for Novo Nordisk A/S and Novozymes A/S. Novo Holdings A/S was established in 1999 and manages the Novo Nordisk Foundation's assets, which in 2021 was worth almost DKK 700 billion Danish Kroner (approximately US$93.73 billion) and is the largest charitable foundation in the world making Novo Holdings A/S a world-leading life sciences investor. Novo Holdings A/S is headquartered in Copenhagen, Denmark, with offices in San Francisco, Boston and Singapore.

Eivind Kolding succeeded Henrik Gürtler as CEO on 1 May 2014. Eivind Kolding left Novo Holdings A/S in March 2016 and Kasim Kutay took over as CEO for the organisation.

Since 2016 Kasim Kutay has been the CEO of Novo Holdings A/S.

Purpose 
Novo Holdings A/S manages the Novo Nordisk Foundation's assets, aiming to enable and make a positive impact on health, science and society by generating long-term returns on the assets of the Novo Nordisk Foundation, which the Novo Nordisk Foundation in return can award as grants for scientific research and humanitarian and social purposes.

The overall purpose of Novo Holdings A/S is to hold the position as the controlling majority shareholder of the Novo Group companies (Novo Nordisk A/S and Novozymes A/S), aiming at making a positive impact on health, science and society by generating long-term returns on the assets of the Novo Nordisk Foundation. The Novo Nordisk Foundation is an enterprise foundation which is a self-governing entity with no owners, focusing on long-term ownership of the Novo Group (Novo Nordisk A/S and Novozymes A/S) while combining business and philanthropy within scientific, humanitarian and social purposes. A key task of Novo Holdings A/S is to act as a stable basis for the commercial activities of Novo Nordisk A/S and Novozymes A/S. Novo Holdings A/S also invests in both financial assets and in companies with application-oriented research in the life sciences.

Objectives 
Novo Holdings A/S' objective is to grow the assets of the Novo Nordisk Foundation. In addition to investing in equity and fixed income securities, Novo Holdings pursues direct investments in life science companies. The Novo Nordisk Foundations share of financial returns generated from investments are added to the Novo Nordisk Foundation endowment and later distributed through charitable grants and awards aiming to improve the lives of people, science and society around the world.

Novo Holdings A/S is recognised as a leading international life science investor focusing on creating long-term value. Besides from being the controlling shareholder in the Novo Group companies (including Novo Nordisk A/S and Novozymes A/S),  Novo Holdings also provides seed and venture capital to companies in the development-stage.

Novo Holdings also takes on significant ownership in growth and well-established companies and manages a broad portfolio of diversified financial assets.

Increased focus on industrial Biosolutions 
In 2021-2022, Novo Holdings have announced an increased investment focusing on Biosolutions (also known under the term bioindustrials or biotechnologies within the healthcare and environmental spaces), aiming to make biotechnology a spearhead for the green transition. Novo Holdings claim that the ambition is "to help remove the roadblocks wherever they are, paving the way for promising biologic discoveries to become new solutions".

In 2021, Novo Holdings added numerous biotechnology companies to its portfolio, including 21st. BIO, which helps other biotechnology companies scale up production through an advanced technology platform.

These diverse investments include companies supplying climate-neutral cement, biopesticides, synthetic silk biopolymers and many other products and solutions that challenge current conventions. Novo Holdings added eight bioindustrial companies to its portfolio in 2021 and invested approx. €98 million ($97.35 million) in total in the bioindustrial space.

Investment profile 
In 2021, the Novo Holdings portfolio focusing on Life Science Investment (Novo Seeds, Novo Growth, Novo Ventures and Novo Principal Investments) made up 52% of the total portfolio while the Novo Capital Investors made up the remaining 48% of the total portfolio. The Life Science Investment portfolio and Novo Capital Investors generated returns of approximately DKK 12 billion ($1.6 billion) in 2021.

 Novo Holding A/S's most common sectors for investment are life sciences (38%) and diversified (13%).
 Novo Holding A/S's most common investment types are secondary buyouts (75%) and recapitalisation (13%).
 Novo Holdings A/S has invested in three US states and five different countries.
 Novo Holdings A/S' most common type of exit is secondary buyout (100%).
 Novo Holding A/S's largest (disclosed) investment was in 2013; the acquisition of Xellia Pharmaceuticals A/S for $700 million.
 Novo Holdings A/S' largest (disclosed) exit was in 2021 when Unchained Labs was sold to The Carlyle Group for $435 million.

Novo Group

The Novo Group comprises Novo Holdings A/S, Novo Nordisk A/S and Novozymes A/S. Novo Holdings A/S owns more than 25% of the ordinary share capital of Novo Nordisk A/S and controls more than 70% of the votes through its ownership of all the preferred (A) shares, which are not traded.
 
The Group's main purpose is to manage the financial assets of the Novo Nordisk Foundation to ensure an adequate financial return to cover the Foundation's investments and grants for scientific, humanitarian and social purposes and projects in the Nordic countries and the rest of the world. The Group achieves this by investing in life science companies in Europe and North America. The Novo Group also invests in a portfolio of financial assets.

Senior management

In 2014, Henrik Gürtler stepped down as CEO after serving in the position since the company was established in 1999. He was replaced by Eivind Kolding, previously the CEO of Danske Bank. On 29 February 2016, Eivind Kolding was dismissed as CEO of Novo A/S after 2 years in the post. He was temporarily replaced until June 2016 by Sten Scheibye, Chair of the Board of Directors. His successor as CEO of Novo Holdings A/S is Kasim Kutay, a British citizen who previously worked for investment banks Morgan Stanley and Moelis & Company.
 
 Kasim Kutay (CEO), 2016 – current
 Sten Scheibye (Chairman and interim CEO), March 2016 – June 2018
 Eivind Kolding, 2014 – 2016
 Henrik Gürtler, 1999 – 2014

Board of Directors

The Board of Directors of Novo Holdings A/S comprises six members (as of December 2018):
 
 Lars Rebien Sørensen (Chairman), July 2018 - current
 Steen Riisgaard (Vice Chairman)
 Viviane Monges
 Francis Michael Cyprian Cuss
 Jeppe Fonager Christiansen
 Jean-Luc Butel
 Britt Meelby Jensen 
 Henrik Poulsen

REPAIR Impact Fund

In February 2018, Novo Holdings announces the establishment of an impact fund commissioned by the Novo Nordisk Foundation with a total initial budget of US$165 million to invest in companies involved in discovering and early-stage development of therapies to combat antimicrobial resistance.

According to CEO Kasim Kutay, Novo Holdings are looking to increase this type of investments in global healthcare challenges: “We are looking to increase investments of this type in the coming years, and we are excited about our potential to make a significant difference in improving global healthcare”.

REPAIR is an acronym for: Replenishing and Enabling the Pipeline for Anti-Infective Resistance.

Investments

In addition to the Novo Group, Novo Holdings A/S owns major stakes in several Danish companies, including the Xellia Group, Sonion and Chr. Hansen Holdings A/S. By the beginning of 2018 Novo Holdings A/S had a portfolio of 85 listed and unlisted Life Science companies in Europe and North America.

Novo Holdings A/S invests mainly in companies that develop, manufacture or sell medicine, new treatment methods or medical or health-related equipment.
 
At the end of 2017, Novo Holdings A/S had allocated nearly DKK 38 billion for investment in portfolios in Large Investments, Ventures and Seeds of DKK 31.5 billion, DKK 5.9 billion and DKK 291 million, respectively.

 In April 2021, Novo Holdings made its first investment in an Asia-based company, Halodoc
 In May 2013, Novo Holdings acquired all shares in the pharmaceutical company Xellia.
 In July 2014, Novo Holdings acquired all shares in Sonion, a manufacturer of components for the hearing aid industry.
 In Marrch 2017, Novo Holdings acquired 20 percent of the shares in the UK listed company Convatec with Kasim Kutay, CEO of Novo Holdings A/S, joining the Board of Directors.

List of all investments

References

External links
 

Holding companies of Denmark
Companies based in Gentofte Municipality